The Alfa Romeo 145 (Type 930A) and the Alfa Romeo 146 (Type 930B) are small family cars produced by Italian automobile manufacturer Alfa Romeo between 1994 and 2000. The 145 is a three-door hatchback and was launched at the 1994 Turin Motor Show, while the 146 is a five-door hatchback, launched in 1995 to replace the Alfa Romeo 33.

The 145 and 146 share exterior and interior components from the B-pillar forwards. A total of 221,037 145s and 233,295 146s were built.

History

Development of Tipo 930, the replacement for the ageing 33 in the competitive family hatchback market, lasted four years. The first offspring of the project, the three door 145, made its début on static display at the April 1994 Turin Motor Show and then at the Paris Motor Show in July; a simultaneous European commercial launch was planned for 9 September, but it was delayed until October.

In April 1992 work began on a second car, the 146 or Tipo 930B, derived from and to be sold alongside the 145; with its more traditional Alfa Romeo style, it was aimed at a different clientele, that of the outgoing 33. The 146 premiered in November 1994 at the Bologna Motor Show and went on sale in May 1995.

At launch, the engine line up for both cars comprised a 1.9 litre inline four turbo diesel and the boxer petrol engines from the 33, in 1.3 8 valve, 1.6 8 valve and range topping 1.7 16 valve forms.
Depending on the market, the engines were available in either or both base and better equipped L (for "Lusso") trim levels; L trim standard equipment was richer on larger engined cars.

Quadrifoglio and ti
Flagship sport models with the two litre 16 valve Twin Spark inline four engine from the 155 arrived a year after the début: the 145 Quadrifoglio and 146 ti. Each of the two litre versions had a unique trim level; both included more standard equipment than the L trims, like ABS, leather wrapped steering wheel and shifter knob and Momo sport seats.

The 145 Quadrifoglio (145 Cloverleaf in the United Kingdom), launched at the September 1995 Frankfurt Motor Show and on sale from October, had deep body colour side skirts with "green cloverleaf" badges and five hole alloy wheels.

The 146 ti went on sale in February 1996. It came with painted side skirts, a boot spoiler and twelve hole alloy wheels. Two litre cars were equipped with stiffer suspension, uprated all disk braking system, ABS, wider, lower profile tyres and 'quick rack' direct steering (also seen on the 155, GTV and Spider) which improved responsiveness, but also compromised the turning circle.

First revisions

From January 1997, all the boxers were phased out in favour of 1.4, 1.6 and 1.8 versions of the Twin Spark 16 valve engine.
1.8 litre cars adopted the sport chassis, steering and brakes of the Quadrifoglio/ti, and also offered some of their optional equipment such as the sport seats. At the same time, the interior was updated: a new air conditioning system, a redesigned dashboard and an upholstered insert were fitted for left-hand drive cars. Right-hand drive cars retained the previous dashboard design. Outside changes were minor: new wheel covers and alloy wheels and a wider choice of paint colours.

In September 1997, Alfa Romeo introduced the Junior, a trim level targeted at young buyers that combined the sport styling and chassis setup of the range topping models, with the affordable entry level 1.4 powertrain, later the 1.6 engine was added to this trim as well. Based on the 1.4 L, Junior cars were distinguished by the Quadrifoglio's side skirts with "Junior" badges, specific 15 inch alloy wheels, and the stainless steel exhaust tip (as well as, on the 146, the boot spoiler) from the ti.

By March 1998, 1.8 and 2.0 Twin Spark engines received the updates first introduced on the 156; due to variable length intake manifolds the two powertrains gained 4 to 5 PS and reached peak torque at engine speeds some 500 rpm lower.

1999 restyling

At the Geneva Motor Show in March 1999, Alfa Romeo introduced the restyled '99 line up for both models. The new common rail direct injection 1.9 turbo-diesel JTD engine replaced the 1.9 TD.

The main changes outside were new, body colour bumpers with round fog lights and narrow protection strips; the interior got new upholstery and detail trim changes such as chrome vent surrounds. Optional side airbags complemented the already available passenger and standard driver airbags.

The Junior trim level was discontinued, in favour of "pack sport" option package that included side skirts, rear spoiler, alloy wheels, leather wrapped steering wheel and sport seats, all standard features on the two litre models. A second "pack lusso" package offered leather steering wheel, velour upholstery and mahogany wood trim.

In September of the next year, at the Paris Motor Show the all-new 147 was officially launched. Eventually, in 2000, the 145 and 146 were superseded by the all-new 147, which was a far bigger commercial success, with its acclaimed front end styling and improved quality.

Specifications
Based, as they were, on the Fiat Group's Tipo Due (Type Two) platform, the 145 and 146 had a unibody structure, front MacPherson strut and rear trailing arm suspension. A peculiarity of these cars is that they were designed to be fitted with both longitudinal engines (the older Boxers]) and with transverse engines (the diesels and the Twin Spark).

The former were mounted in the same configuration as on the 33 or Alfasud, that is longitudinally overhanging the front axle with the gearbox towards the cabin; the latter in the conventional transverse position with the gearbox to the left side. All engines were coupled to a five speed manual transmissions. Steering was rack and pinion, with standard hydraulic power assistance.

Engines

Performance

Notes

References

External links

Alfa Romeo 145 / 146 Technical Centre 

Compact cars
Hatchbacks
Sedans
Front-wheel-drive vehicles
Cars powered by boxer engines
2000s cars
Cars introduced in 1994
Cars introduced in 1995